Donald Thomas DiFrancesco (born November 20, 1944) is a retired American politician who served as the 51st governor of New Jersey from 2001 to 2002. He succeeded Christine Todd Whitman after her resignation to become Administrator of the Environmental Protection Agency. A member of the Republican Party, DiFrancesco previously was President of the New Jersey Senate from 1992 to 2002.

Education and early career
Born in Scotch Plains, New Jersey, DiFrancesco attended Scotch Plains-Fanwood High School, where he was senior class president. He graduated in 1966 with a Bachelor's Degree from Penn State University in business, and was awarded a J.D. degree from Seton Hall University School of Law in 1969.  He served as Scotch Plains Municipal Attorney.

New Jersey Legislature
DiFrancesco was elected to the New Jersey General Assembly in 1975. He won a contested Republican primary, defeating former Assemblyman Arthur Manner by 1,067 votes. He defeated incumbent Democratic Assemblywoman Betty Wilson (New Jersey politician) by 2,387 votes.  He was re-elected in 1977 by a margin of 4,709 votes.

DiFrancsco won a 1979 special election for State Senator when the Republican incumbent, Peter J. McDonough resigned. He defeated his running mate, Assemblyman William J. Maguire at the Union County Republican Convention; in general election, he defeated Springfield Mayor Joanne Rajoppi by 6,917 votes. He was re-elected in 1981, 1983, 1987, 1991, 1993 and 1997.

DiFrancesco ran for Senate Minority Leader after the 1981 elections, eschewing the traditional rotation of leadership posts. He defeated James P. Vreeland (R-Towaco), who had served as Assistant Minority Leader during the previous session. DiFrancesco's attempt to win GOP control of the upper house in 1983 was unsuccessful. After Republicans won a majority of seats in the 1991 election, DiFrancesco used a similar strategy and beat the sitting Minority Leader, John H. Dorsey, to win the Senate presidency.

Governor
DiFrancesco, a state senator representing the Scotch Plains area, became governor when fellow Republican Christine Todd Whitman resigned from office to join the administration of newly elected President George W. Bush.

At the time of Whitman's resignation, the New Jersey Constitution stipulated that the Senate president retains that position while also serving as acting governor. This made DiFrancesco, in his own words, the most powerful New Jersey governor ever (and perhaps the most powerful governor ever) because he was the leader of both the State Senate and executive branch simultaneously. This distinction was shared by later acting governors Robert E. Littell, John O. Bennett and Richard Codey.

DiFrancesco's title was officially Acting Governor until it was changed retroactively by legislation passed on January 10, 2006, which classified anyone who, after January 1, 2001, acted as governor for longer than 180 days as a full governor.

2001 election

DiFrancesco initially planned to run for a full term as governor in the 2001 election. Democratic Woodbridge Mayor Jim McGreevey and Republican Jersey City Mayor Bret Schundler also sought the governorship. Polls showed DiFrancesco with a commanding lead over the more conservative Schundler in the primary, but trailing McGreevey (although performing better against him than Schundler) with a large number of undecided voters. DiFrancesco abruptly withdrew from the race in April 2001 after a number of unfavorable news stories emerged concerning his past legal and business dealings. A report in The New York Times suggested that the media criticism took a heavy toll on DiFrancesco, who had never before been subjected to the intense scrutiny of a statewide campaign, and his family, ultimately prompting his withdrawal. Under New Jersey law, a candidate can designate a replacement to appear on the ballot in the event of his/her withdrawal. DiFrancesco designated former Representative Bob Franks, who had only narrowly lost to Jon Corzine in a 2000 Senate race despite being massively outspent by Corzine in a year in which Democrats gained four seats in the Senate. However, despite receiving widespread support from the New Jersey Republican establishment, Franks was soundly defeated by Schundler in the Republican primary, who went on to lose to McGreevey in the general election by a wide margin.

Approval ratings
An August 7, 2001, Quinnipiac University Polling Institute poll showed Donald DiFrancesco's approval ratings at 54%, but what was remarkable about that poll is that it showed he had a 48% approval rating among Democrats.

Current activities
DiFrancesco presently serves on the Commerce Bancorp board of directors and is a partner in a law firm. He resides with his wife and children in Warren Township, New Jersey.

In August 2011, there was a feud between New Jersey Governor Christie and New York City mayor Michael Bloomberg over whether DiFrancesco would be invited to the tenth anniversary of the September 11th attacks ceremony in Lower Manhattan, since DiFrancesco was governor during the attacks.

Notes

References

External links
New Jersey Governor Donald T. DiFrancesco, National Governors Association
 

|-

|-

|-

1944 births
Living people
Commerce Bancorp
Republican Party governors of New Jersey
Republican Party members of the New Jersey General Assembly
Republican Party New Jersey state senators
People from Scotch Plains, New Jersey
Scotch Plains-Fanwood High School alumni
People from Warren Township, New Jersey
Smeal College of Business alumni
Presidents of the New Jersey Senate
Seton Hall University School of Law alumni
American people of Italian descent